Tancredo Thomas de Faria Airport  is the airport that serves Guarapuava, Brazil.
 
It is operated by the Municipality of Guarapuava under the supervision of Aeroportos do Paraná (SEIL).

Airlines and destinations

Access

See also

List of airports in Brazil

References

External links

Airports in Paraná (state)
Guarapuava